Gossen may refer to:

Economics 
 Hermann Heinrich Gossen (1810–1858), Prussian economist
 Gossen's laws, his laws concerning such economic concepts as scarcity and marginal utility
 Gossen's second law
 Gossen Prize

Other 
 Gossen, dative form of Gossa, a Norwegian island
 Gossen IL, a sports club from Gossa

See also
 Franz Müller-Gossen (1871–1946), German painter
 Gosen (disambiguation)